The Dr. Morgan Smith House is a historic house at 5110 Stagecoach Road in Little Rock, Arkansas.  It is a two-story wood-frame structure, with a complex roof line and weatherboard siding.  It is a sophisticated example of Craftsman styling, with a porch and porte-cochere supported by stone columns (supposedly built using cobblestones from central Little Rock), and extended eaves with exposed rafter tails.  The house was built in 1918 for a prominent local doctor, housing both his home and office.

The house was listed on the National Register of Historic Places in 2009.

See also
National Register of Historic Places listings in Little Rock, Arkansas

References

Houses on the National Register of Historic Places in Arkansas
Houses in Little Rock, Arkansas